Ataenius hesperius is a species of aphodiine dung beetle in the family Scarabaeidae. It is found in North America. It is closely related to Ataenius texanus, but it tends to live farther West.

References

Further reading

 

Scarabaeidae
Articles created by Qbugbot
Beetles described in 1974